National University of Laos Football Club (Laos) is a professional football club, based in Vientiane, Laos, that plays in the Lao Premier League, the highest division in Laotian football until 2018 and now play in Lao Division 1. The club plays its home matches at the National University of Laos Stadium, which seats 5,000.

Sponsors

Football clubs in Laos
University and college association football clubs